Siegmund of Brandenburg-Bayreuth (27 September 1468, in Ansbach – 26 February 1495, in Ansbach) was the sixth, but third surviving, son of Albrecht III, Margrave of Brandenburg, Ansbach and Bayreuth.  His mother was his father's second wife, Anna of Saxony. On the death of his father on 11 March 1486, his elder brothers Johann Cicero and Friedrich succeeded to Brandenburg and Ansbach respectively, and Siegmund succeeded to Bayreuth. He never married, and at his death Bayreuth passed to his elder brother Frederick I of Ansbach.

Ancestors

External links
 

 

Bayreuth, Siegmund Margrave of
Bayreuth, Siegmund Margrave of
Margraves of Bayreuth
Burials at Heilsbronn Abbey